[[File:Greatvalley-map.png|thumb|300px|The barrier ridge of the Appalachian Mountain chain extends from New England to Georgia, and Alabama. Some of the local names, such as the Alleghenies for parts of the chain are marked; others are labeled on other maps on this page. Through the Appalachians west of the Berkshires, there were just five openings allowing east to west animal-powered travel within the United States up until the 1930s,{{
efn
 |Writing in 'Historic Indian Paths of Pennsylvania' in 1952, a preliminary study report to the Pennsylvania and Museum Commission on the state of his research under the direction of the State Historian S.K. Stevens, author Paul A. W. Wallace 
}} giving emphasis as to the importance of the three interiors mountain passes like the Gaps of the Allegheny Ridge.]] 
 

The gaps of the Allegheny,<ref
name="AmHeritageBk"></ref> meaning gaps in the Allegheny Ridge (now given the technical name Allegheny Front) in west-central Pennsylvania, is a series of escarpment eroding water gaps (notches or small valleys) along the saddle between two higher barrier ridge-lines in the eastern face atop the Allegheny Ridge or Allegheny Front escarpment. The front extends south through Western Maryland and forms much of the border between Virginia and West Virginia, in part explaining the difference in cultures between those two post-Civil War states. While not totally impenetrable to daring and energetic travelers on foot, passing the front outside of the water gaps with even sure footed mules was nearly impossible without navigating terrain where climbing was necessary on slopes even burros would find extremely difficult.

The gaps, formed by small streams, provide several usable incline planes, or ramps, connecting the eastern river valley lowlands to the highlands atop the plateau to the west and north, that would otherwise have been unnavigable by animal powered wagons before the mid-1930s. As the map at right indicates, there were but five ways west from the eastern seaboard (colonies) to beyond the Appalachians barrier ridges. The gaps in the Allegheny, all west of present-day Hollidaysburg and Altoona, are by Hurlbert grouped as part of the Kittanning Gorge, with the eponymous name borrowed from the Lenape (Delaware nation, once centered in the Delaware Valley, ranging from New York Harbor to the northern Chesapeake, occupying the Lehigh Valley and eastern Pennsylvania, New Jersey, and Delaware), but made immigrants forced west of the Mountains into empty lands during the 18th century. 

The streams cutting those various gaps either let out into the Susquehanna River tributaries, the Juniata River, or the West Branch of the Susquehanna, so gave the rich Pennsylvania Dutch country access to the interior and the ramp-like valleys climbing to the divide, as did the Main Branch of the Susquehanna and its tributaries climbing to the ridges overlooking both the Hudson and the Mohawk Valleys.

Hurlbert, in his study The Paths of Inland Commerce, makes a distinction between the gaps leading up from the Susquehanna across the divide from the Allegheny River, those in between the Monongahela and the Allegheny, and those reachable across the divide between the Potomac River, and the Monongahela and the Cheat Rivers — only grouping the first batch in his usage of gaps of the Allegheny.

The terms gaps of the Allegheny and the formal geology term, the Allegheny Front, are from two different disciplines. The former is used by historians (most often) describing the local measures taken during the French and Indian War and Native American territories before the United States Constitution, or discussing the transport network east to west before the 1930s depression's public works projects drove hundreds of roads into and through the mountains years after wagon road turnpikes established corporate through-ways that generally went out of business with the rise of railroads. 

These low water gaps of the Allegheny are located in an arc in the depression between higher barrier ridge-lines, a family or succession of half-mountain passes letting out in a similar series of water courses, albeit rising more gradually from the west, where the depressed upland was caused by the weight of the immense plateau glacier that flattened the Appalachian Plateau long ago. In the days before academia began traveling to fancy conferences in vacation cities and formed committees to standardize terms, place names were generally applied locally, copied by the USGS making regional maps, and in that era the last escarpment rising to the Allegheny Plateau was generally known as Allegheny Mountain or the Allegheny Ridge or just The Allegheny. The modern term of art, the Allegheny Front, was coined by physical geologists and other earth scientists interested in geomorphology reasoning out the processes that make one landscape terrain different from another in time, cause and space.

Greater geology
The geology of the curious ridge and valley formations are the remnants of an ancient fold-and-thrust belt, west of the mountain core that formed in the Alleghenian orogeny (Stanley, 421-2). Here, strata have been folded westward, and forced over massive thrust faults; there is little metamorphism, and no igneous intrusion. (Stanley, 421-2) The ridges represent the edges of the erosion-resistant strata, and the valleys portray the absence of the more erodible strata.

Smaller streams have developed their valleys following the lines of the more easily eroded strata but for a few water gaps.But a few major rivers, such as the Delaware River, the Susquehanna River, the New River, and the Potomac River, are evidently older than the present mountains, having cut water gaps that are perpendicular to hard strata ridges. The evidence points to a wearing down of the entire region (the original mountains) to a low level with little relief, so that major rivers were flowing in unconsolidated sediments that were unaffected by the underlying rock structure. Then the region was uplifted slowly enough that the rivers were able to maintain their course, cutting through the ridges as they developed.

Valleys may be synclinal valleys or anticlinal valleys.

These mountains are at their highest development in central Pennsylvania, a phenomenon termed the Pennsylvania climax.

History

Below Canada, the geologic nature of successive barrier ridges of the Ridge and Valley Appalachians run from the valley of the Hudson, the Delaware Water Gap, down through all of northern Pennsylvania, sundering eastern and central Pennsylvania, Maryland, and North Carolina, Virginia from the eastern Great Lakes, Western Pennsylvania, West Virginia, West Kentucky, and Western Tennessee. Different gaps of the Allegheny had slopes that were more or less amenable to foot travel, pack mules, and possibly wagons, allowing Native Americans and the occasional trader, using one of the Kittanning Paths, and then, after about 1778–1780, settlers, to travel west into the relatively depopulated Ohio Country. 

The gaps, like the other two major breaks inside the Appalachians barrier mountain chain, the Cumberland Narrows and Cumberland Gap well to the south, were the only ways to cross into the central lowlands of the Mississippi valley in the long decades before the railroads were born and tied the country together with steel using each as a transportation corridor ever since. Right up until the engineering projects that began with the political movement to connect cities and towns with roads better than dirt tracks in the 1920s, there simply were no ways in most areas to transit the barrier of these mountains without well developed wilderness skills.

Historically, one of the southern gaps, the Blair Gap was used for the upper sections of the Allegheny Portage Railroad, which as was authorized by the enabling acts in 1824 of Pennsylvania's Main Line of Public Works as part of the Pennsylvania Canal System which originally envisioned linking Pittsburgh to Philadelphia by canals. In the early 20th century, US Route 22 followed alongside the watercourse through that particular gap. Just to the north, the famous Horseshoe Curve built by the Pennsylvania Railroad crosses or utilizes no less than four gaps of the Alleghenies as it wends its way to cross the drainage divide in its two climb-saving tunnels built through the summit to its marshaling yard in Gallitzin, PA.

Until around the 1920s, after newly-founded auto clubs gathered enough numbers for political clout to push for initiatives creating roads between towns, beside the railroads, the primary means of travel from town to town was on foot or, where hauling was needed, using wagons. There were only five ways through the Appalachians east to west: Around the south (plains or Piedmont area) in Georgia, the Cumberland Gap, the Cumberland Narrows, the gaps of the Allegheny Front, and up the Hudson River then around the north end of the Catskills and across upstate New York, the so-called level water route to the Great Lakes. 

All other transits involved difficult climbs a man on foot could only make with great difficulty, and which animal drawn transport could not. Geographically and geologically, without the large projects and engineering capabilities of the 20th century, there were exactly three internal regions where it was possible to get animal powered vehicles from the east side to the west side of the Appalachian Mountains, making five routes overall counting traveling around the plains at either end of the western chain.

Elsewhere, the mountains were pierced by various local and state roads during the public works projects of the Great Depression years sponsored by the Works Progress Administration in the 1930s, when and where large edifices were not needed; and where major engineering works were needed, these roads taken for granted so much today could not be constructed until capital and the 20th century technologies such as bulldozers, steam shovels, and steel bridges became available and politically necessary. These new roads, now all less than 100 years old so young in terms of geography, would greatly diminish awareness of how important the three bottleneck passes were through the mountains or the influence of the routes around the two ends.

List of Gaps
The official USGS Geographic Name Identification System (GNIS) assigns the following names and the associated data for the various gaps of the Allegheny Ridge.

Blair Gap

Blair Gap, one of the gaps of the Allegheny, is a water gap along the eastern face atop the Allegheny Ridge or Allegheny Front escarpment. Like other gaps of the Allegheny'', the slopes of Blair Gap were amenable to foot travel, pack mules, and possibly wagons, allowing Native Americans, and then, after about 1778–1780 settlers, to travel west into the relatively un-populated Ohio Country decades before the railroads were born and tied the country together with steel. Historically, the gap was used for the upper sections of the Allegheny Portage Railroad, which as was authorized by the enabling acts in 1824 of Pennsylvania's Main Line of Public Works as part of the Pennsylvania Canal System which originally envisioned linking Pittsburgh to Philadelphia by canals.

Kittanning Gap
The USGS official Kittanning Gap contains at best a small spring that is most active as a spring freshet. Examination of the topology however shows that notch leads to a series of climbable traverses and was quite possibly the route of choice for wagons climbing toward the gently rolling oddly folded hill country summit and divide near the source of Clearfield Creek, Pennsylvania. Having reached that height, the travelers had also climbed the escarpment, albeit by a longer more circuitous climb than by directly assaulting one of the steeper but narrower gaps cut by more vigorous streams.

The gap of Kittanning Run
Next upstream along Glen White Run and above Kittanning Gap is the gap carved by Kittanning Run, a creek which originates in a woodland above a field in a bedroom community in Gallitzin Township, Pennsylvania at an elevation a bit over  ...

Notes

References

Water gaps of Pennsylvania
Landforms of Blair County, Pennsylvania
Landforms of Huntingdon County, Pennsylvania
Geology of Pennsylvania
Geography of Pennsylvania